A Gaussian integer is either the zero, one of the four units (±1, ±i), a Gaussian prime or composite. The article is a table of Gaussian Integers  followed either by an explicit factorization or followed by the label (p) if the integer is a Gaussian prime. The factorizations take the form of an optional unit multiplied by integer powers of Gaussian primes.

Note that there are rational primes which are not Gaussian primes.

Conventions
The second column of the table contains only integers in the first quadrant, which means the real part x is positive and the imaginary part y is non-negative. The table might have been further reduced to the integers in the first octant of the
complex plane using the symmetry
.

The factorizations are often not unique in the sense that the unit could be absorbed into any other factor with exponent equal to one. The entries in the table resolve this ambiguity by the following convention: the factors are primes in the right complex half plane with absolute value of the real part larger than or equal to the absolute value of the imaginary part.

The entries are sorted according to increasing norm  . The table is complete up to the maximum norm at the end of the table in the sense that
each composite or prime in the first quadrant appears in the second column.

Gaussian primes occur only for a subset of norms, detailed in sequence .

Factorizations

See also
 Gaussian integer
 Table of divisors
 Integer factorization

References

External links
 
 
 OEIS: Gaussian Primes

Complex numbers
Gaussian integer factorizations